The Norwegian News Agency (abbreviated NTB) is a Norwegian press agency and wire service that serves most of the largest Norwegian media outlets. The agency is located in Oslo and has bureaus in Brussels in Belgium and Tromsø in northern Norway. NTB operates 24 hours a day, with the night service handled from a bureau in Sydney, Australia since 2015. The photo agency Scanpix is a wholly owned subsidiary of NTB.

History and profile
NTB was founded in 1867. It is closely held by large media corporations, including Edda Media (26.1%), Schibsted (20.6%), A-Pressen (20.5%), the Norwegian Broadcasting Corporation (10.5%), Adresseavisen (7.8%), a few smaller newspapers, TV 2 and P4. 0.5% is owned by the agency's employees.

The agency has three main news services, covering domestic news, international news, and sports. It also provides special services within news graphics, video, culture, entertainment, feature, etc.  Approximately 136 staff are employed by the agency. Pål Bjerketvedt is the editor-in-chief and managing director;  Ole Kristian Bjellaanes is the executive editor.

References

External links
 NTB's website

1867 establishments in Norway
Mass media companies established in the 1860s
News agencies based in Norway
News media in Norway
NRK
Mass media in Oslo
Photo agencies